Rear-Admiral David Charles Cairns, 5th Earl Cairns,  (3 July 1909 – 21 March 1989), was Marshal of the Diplomatic Corps in the Royal Household of the Sovereign of the United Kingdom from 1962 to 1971.

Early life
Cairns was born on 3 July 1909. He was the second son of Wilfred Cairns, 4th Earl Cairns and Olive Cobbold. His elder brother, Brig. Hugh Cairns, Viscount Garmoyle, died unmarried at age 35 in 1942 at El Alamein, Egypt, from wounds received in action. Among his sisters was Lady Hester (who married Robert Bourne), Lady Ursula (who married John Roland Abbey), and Lady Sheila (who married Maj. Charles Holroyd of the Rifles), and Lady Katharine (who was a Senior Commander in the Auxiliary Territorial Service).

His maternal grandfather was John Patteson Cobbold, MP for Ipswich. His paternal grandparents were Hugh Cairns, 1st Earl Cairns, a British statesman who served as Lord Chancellor during the first two ministries of Benjamin Disraeli, and the former Mary Harriet MacNeile.

Career
Cairns joined the Royal Navy in 1923, and was promoted to the rank of lieutenant in 1931. He served in World War II and succeeded as the 5th Earl Cairns in 1946 before becoming deputy director of the Signal Department at the Admiralty in 1950. He went on to be Commanding Officer of the cruiser  in 1956 and President of the Royal Naval College, Greenwich in 1958 before retiring in 1961.

Later life
In retirement Cairns was Marshal of the Diplomatic Corps in the Royal Household of the Sovereign of the United Kingdom from 1962 to 1971. He was also a Liveryman of the Worshipful Company of Fishmongers of the City of London, rising to become the company's Prime Warden for 1972–73, and for many years was Chairman of the Governing Body of Gresham's School. In 1973, he served as Deputy Lieutenant of Suffolk.

Personal life
On 16 April 1936, David married Barbara Jeanne Harrisson Burgess, a daughter of Sydney Harrisson Burgess. Together, they were the parents of:

 Simon Dallas Cairns, 6th Earl Cairns (b. 1939), who married Amanda Mary Heathcoat-Amory (granddaughter of Maj. Ludovic Heathcoat-Amory).
 Hon. Hugh Andrew David Cairns (b. 1942), who married Elizabeth Bell, daughter of Lt.-Col. Francis Cecil Leonard Bell.
 Lady Elisabeth Olive Cairns (1944–1998), who married Capt. Martin Ralph Lowe, son of Maj. Ralph Mason Lowe.

Lord Cairns died on 21 March 1989. On his death in 1989 he was succeeded by his eldest son, Simon.

References

External links

1909 births
1989 deaths
Companions of the Order of the Bath
Earls in the Peerage of the United Kingdom
Knights Grand Cross of the Royal Victorian Order
Marshals of the Diplomatic Corps
Royal Navy rear admirals
Prime Wardens of the Worshipful Company of Fishmongers
Admiral presidents of the Royal Naval College, Greenwich